Theodora Pallidou (born 14 September 1988) is a Greek individual rhythmic gymnast. She represents her nation at international competitions. 

She participated at the 2004 Summer Olympics in Athens. 
She also competed at world championships, including at the 2003 World Rhythmic Gymnastics Championships.

References

External links

1988 births
Living people
Greek rhythmic gymnasts
Place of birth missing (living people)
Gymnasts at the 2004 Summer Olympics
Olympic gymnasts of Greece